Kodinhi is a village in Malappuram district in Kerala, India. The village is situated close to the town of Tirurangadi and, as of 2008, is home to around 2,000 families.

Administered by the Nannambra panchayat, the village came to international attention for the unusually large number of multiple births in the region, especially twins, although India has one of the lowest twinning rates in the world.
The first association of twins in the country, The Twins and Kins Association, was also founded in the village.

Geography
The village is surrounded by backwaters on all sides but one, which connects it to the town of Tirurangadi.

Culture and demographics
As of November 2008, the population of the village was estimated at 2,000 families. A majority of the residents are Sunni Muslim, and follow the Shafi school of thought. A significant Salafi Muslim and Hindu minorities also resides here.

Twin births 

The village entered the international spotlight when a survey done by locals found an unusually large number of twin births in the region. A report by The New Indian Express Staff Correspondent Mithosh Joseph from Malappuram had brought the attention of several people outside India to the attraction of the spot. His report had featured well the ongoing researches in the area, the total number of twins, the peculiarities of parents and a few other comments by doctors who studied the strange phenomenon.  Though initial estimates put the instance of multiple births at 100 pairs, follow-up surveys found the figure to be closer to 204 pairs (408 individuals) of twins, and two sets of triplets. Despite several studies being conducted, the exact cause of this phenomenon is yet to be ascertained. Women from Kodinhi married off to far away places are also known to give birth to twins. According to doctors this phenomenon is due to chemicals present in water in the Kodinhi area. According to locals, the oldest known twin pair in the village was born in 1949. The number of twin births in Kodinhi has been increasing over the years, with surveys showing over 79 pairs of twins within the age group of 0–10 years.

This phenomenon of a large number of twin births is not unique to Kodinhi, and has also been observed in the town of Igbo-Ora in Nigeria. In Igbo-Ora, research has suggested that the multiple births could be related to the eating habits of the women in the region. Though no direct correlation between dietary intake and twin births has been observed, a research study carried out at the University of Lagos Teaching Hospital has suggested that a chemical found in the Igbo-Ora women and the peelings of a widely consumed tuber could account for the high level of multiple births. In the case of Kodinhi, however, no such relationship has been observed, as the residents' dietary patterns are not known to be significantly different from the rest of Kerala.

A similar phenomenon of a large number of twin births within a small isolated community has been observed in Cândido Godói, Brazil.

In 2008, around 30 pairs of twins from Kodinhi, along with their parents, got together to form The Twins and Kins Association, the first such association of twins in India. The forum, according to its founders, aims to bring to wider attention problems peculiar to people of multiple births, such as those concerning their education and health.

Transportation
Kodinhi village connects to other parts of India through Parappanangadi town. National highway No.66 passes through Ramanattukara and the northern stretch connects to Goa and Mumbai.  The southern stretch connects to Cochin and Trivandrum. State Highway No.28 starts from Nilambur Ooty, Mysore and Bangalore through Highways.12,29 and 181. The nearest airport is at Kozhikode.  The nearest major railway station are Parappanangadi, Tanur and Tirur.

References

External links
 National Geographic Cities: Twin Town
 Kerala village floats first forum of twins
 Babies come in twos in this Kerala village
 `Twin tale ' of Kodinji to cross the seas

Villages in Malappuram district
Populated places with highest incidence of multiple birth
Parappanangadi area